Lechenaultia juncea, commonly known as reed-like leschenaultia, is a species of flowering plant in the family Goodeniaceae and is endemic to the south-west of Western Australia. It is an erect, perennial herb or shrub with crowded, fleshy leaves, and pale blue flowers.

Description
Flowering occurs from November to December.

Taxonomy
Lechenaultia juncea was first formally described in 1905 by Ernst Georg Pritzel in Botanische Jahrbücher für Systematik, Pflanzengeschichte und Pflanzengeographie from specimens collected near Watheroo. The specific epithet (juncea) means "rush-like".

Distribution and habitat
Reed-like leschenaultia grows in heath in gravel or sandy soils between Three Springs and Gunyidi in the Avon Wheatbelt and Geraldton Sandplains biogeographic regions of south-western Western Australia.

Conservation status
This leschenaultia is listed as "Priority Three" by the Government of Western Australia Department of Biodiversity, Conservation and Attractions, meaning that it is poorly known and known from only a few locations but is not under imminent threat.

References

juncea
Plants described in 1905
Flora of Western Australia
Taxa named by Ernst Pritzel